Mauléon is the name or part of the name of several communes in France:

 Mauléon, Deux-Sèvres, in the Deux-Sèvres department
 Mauléon Aerodrome
 Mauléon-d'Armagnac, in the Gers department
 Mauléon-Barousse, in the Hautes-Pyrenees department
 Mauléon-Licharre, in the Pyrénées-Atlantiques department
Le Bâtard de Mauléon,  French novel by Alexandre Dumas.